Elections to the Borough Council in Slough, England, were held on 1 May 2008. This was the 123rd Slough general local authority election (including both whole council elections and elections by thirds) since Slough became a local government unit in 1863.

The regular 2008 election was to fill fourteen seats, one from each ward, for the 2008-2012 term. These fourteen seats were last contested in the whole Council election of 2004, following the redrawing of the ward boundaries in the Borough.

The election also filled a casual vacancy, for the remaining three years of a 2007-2011 term. The vacancy was caused when Eshaq Khan (Conservative-Central ward) was removed from office, on 18 March 2008, following the hearing of an election petition (for more details see the external link to the judgment of the Election Commissioner below).

The remaining twenty-six Slough Councillors will continue in office, for seats which will be next contested in 2010 or 2011.

In an election where, in most parts of England, the Labour Party did badly; in Slough they regained control of the Council for the first time since 2004. Labour gained two seats from the Conservatives (and arguably a third by taking the vacant seat, last held by Eshaq Khan), one seat from the Liberal Democrats and one seat from the UK Independence Party. The Tories offset their losses by gaining one seat from Labour and another from The Slough Party. As a result of these changes the Council then had 23 Labour members and 18 opposition councillors.

Dissension within the Labour Party, within a few weeks of the election, led to three councillors defecting to the Conservative Party; producing a 21 non-Labour and 20 Labour split on the Council. Two of them returned to Labour later the same day, again reversing control of the Council.

Recent political history of Slough

Slough has an unusual balance of political forces. The council, between 2004 and 2008, had no party in overall control. A coalition of the Britwellian, Independent, Liberal and Liberal Democrats Group (BILLD) and the Conservative Group formed a coalition administration. In the 2007-2008 municipal year the Labour Group and the one councillor of The Slough Party were in opposition.

The BILLD Group is itself a local coalition, before the 2008 election containing members from five parties or groups of independents. The organisations represented in the group, as at April 2008, were the Slough Liberal Democrats, the Slough Liberals, the United Kingdom Independence Party (UKIP), the Independent Britwellian Residents and Independents from Wexham Lea ward. The existing members of the Group had an electoral pact for the 2008 election, continuing electoral arrangements which started with the 2001 Slough Council election.

The Slough Party and a number of Independents, not affiliated to the BILLD group or the coalition administration, also contested the 2008 election.

In the previous election, in 2007, the Labour Party gained one seat from the Conservatives and one from the Liberal Democrats. However the Conservative Party defeated the then longest serving Labour Councillor and former Mayor, Lydia Simmons. This return was subsequently found, by an Election Commissioner, to have been obtained by corrupt and illegal means. Labour finished the 2007 count with a net gain of one, which left Slough Council still in a state of no overall control. The existing coalition administration (supported by all Councillors not in the Labour group, except for one) continued in office for the 2007-2008 municipal year.

During 2007-2008 the Conservative Party lost one seat following the hearing of an election petition. The casual vacancy, caused by the removal from office of former Councillor Eshaq Khan (Conservative-Central ward), was filled at the May election.

At the time of the 2008 election there were twenty councillors each supporting the administration and the opposition, with one vacancy. A single net gain by the opposition parties would have probably resulted in a change of administration. Two net gains for the Labour Party would ensure the first single party majority administration since the party lost control in 2004.

After the election count Labour secured four net gains, to give the party a 23:18 margin and a majority of five for the start of the 2008-2009 municipal year.

 * Member of the Britwellian, Independent, Liberal and Liberal Democrats Group (BILLD)

Election result 2008

The change in Conservative representation is calculated on the basis of the outcome of the 2007 count, without regard to the subsequent  election petition.

The plus/minus figure is the change in votes percentage from the 2007 Slough Council election.

Total valid votes: 29,910
Total spoilt votes: 182
Slough BC turnout: 32.93%

New Council by group: Labour 23, BILLD 12 (Independent 3, Independent Britwellian Residents 3, Liberal 3, Liberal Democrats 3), Conservative 6. Total 41.

Labour majority: 5.

Changes after the election

The Labour Party officially decided to nominate Raja Mohammaed Zarait (Chalvey) for Mayor, Joginder Singh Bal (Farnham) for Deputy Mayor, Robert Anderson (Farnham) for Leader of the Council and James Swindlehurst (Cippenham Green) for Deputy Leader of the Council. These nominations were due to be confirmed at the Annual Meeting of the Council on 15 May 2008.

Pervez Choudhry, elected as a Labour Councillor for Central on 1 May 2008, claimed that 15 of the then 23 Labour Councillors had wanted him as leader. Councillor Diana Coad (Conservative-Langley St Mary's) announced, on 12 May 2008, that Choudhry and an unspecified number of other ex-Labour councillors would enable the Conservative-BILLD coalition to remain in control.  Slough and Langley Observer on-line, recovered 12 May 2008
Windsor Express on-line, recovered 12 May 2008

On 13 May 2008 the Conservatives announced that two more Labour Councillors had defected to them, reducing the Labour group to 20 members and giving the 21 non-Labour Councillors the chance to control the Council. The new defecting Councillors were Sukhjit Dhaliwal (Farnham) and Mohammed Rasib (Chalvey). Slough Observer on-line, recovered 13 May 2008

Later, on 13 May 2008, the Labour Party announced that the two Councillors were no longer leaving, so the balance on the Council would be 22-19 in favour of Labour. The Labour Party Chairman was quoted as saying "There was an internal misunderstanding and certain people tried to exploit that. Once it is all over they party needs to look at what happened and how it can be rectified for the future."
Slough Observer on-line, recovered 13 May 2008

On 15 May 2008 the Labour nominees for Mayor, Deputy Mayor, Leader of the Council (and Labour group) and Deputy Leader were installed in office. The Leader of the Opposition (and BILLD group leader) is Robert Plimmer (Liberal Democrat-Foxborough) and the leader of the Conservative group is Derek Cryer (Conservative-Langley St Mary's).

Summary of Election results by party from 2004

Note: The 2004 election was for the whole Council. Other elections are for a third of the Council. For them the overall totals, after the election, are given in brackets.

List of Councillors whose terms expired in 2008

 * Member of the Britwellian, Independent, Liberal and Liberal Democrats Group (BILLD)

Ward results

A candidate who was an incumbent Councillor for the ward being contested has an * following their name. An incumbent Councillor for another ward, has a + following the name.

Figures for the eligible electorate are given as at 3 March 2008. The Returning Officer has confirmed that the number of electors for each Ward has to be based on the current Register, plus any alterations made up to 3 March. The number given is derived from the full register, not the edited register available to the general public. The spoilt votes and turnout figures are taken from the Slough Council website.

The maximum election expenses for a candidate are calculated on the basis of £600 plus 5 pence for every entry in the register (as first published).

The change columns record alterations from the 2007 results. In Central Ward, where there were two seats up this year and only one last year, no attempt is made to calculate changes in party vote share. The problems with vote fraud in 2007 would, in any event, make any figures for changes in that ward largely meaningless.

Swing figures are only calculated when the same two parties shared the first two places in both the 2007 and 2008 elections. The swing given is two party or Butler swing, ignoring votes for other candidates. Swing is not calculated for Central Ward, for the same reasons why changes are not calculated. Contrary to the usual convention a positive swing figure is towards Labour and a negative swing towards Conservative (or other party as specified in the result).

Total eligible electorate for the Borough: 82,724

Baylis and Stoke (Labour gain from Liberal Democrats)

Britwell (Independent Britwellian Residents hold)

Paul Janik is a former Independent Britwellian Residents Councillor for this ward, serving from 2003 to 2006.

Central (2008-2012 term: Labour gain from Conservative; 2008-2011 term: Labour gain from vacant)

As two seats were filled at the election, the bloc vote electoral system was used. Each elector was entitled to cast up to two votes. The candidate with most votes was elected to the four-year term and the one in second place was returned for three years.

A local newspaper (the Slough Observer) reported, in its edition of 18 April 2008, that Councillor Aziz (the current Deputy Mayor of Slough) had appeared at Slough Magistrates Court facing charges related to the election fraud scandal at last year's Central ward election. The councillor was suspended from the Conservative Party on Thursday 17 April 2008. As it was too late for a nominated candidate to withdraw from this year's election, Councillor Aziz will remain on the ballot as an official Conservative candidate. Former Councillor Eshaq Khan, one of the other defendants in the criminal case, had been expelled from the Conservative Party following the recent election court hearing.

Councillor Pervez Choudhry was an incumbent councillor for the Chalvey ward, at the time of the election. A.S. Dhaliwal had represented the ward from 2000 until the 2004 Slough Council election.

Chalvey (Conservative gain from Labour)

Cippenham Green (Labour gain from UK Independence Party)

Geoff Howard is a former Slough Councillor for the Labour Party and then the Conservative Party. He ultimately joined UKIP in 2004, shortly before the parliamentary election of 2005 at which he contested the Slough seat for his new party. He was seeking re-election to the council seat which he last won as a Conservative candidate in 2004.

Cippenham Meadows (Labour hold)

Kevin Pond is a former councillor, representing Upton ward between 2004 and 2006. He was nominated shortly before the close of nominations when the previous Conservative candidate proved to be ineligible.

Colnbrook with Poyle (Labour gain from Conservative)

Councillor Smith was, at the time of the election, the leader of the Conservative group on Slough Council.

Farnham (Labour hold)

Councillor Anderson was the leader of the Labour group on Slough Council. Sumander Khan represented Central ward from 2004 to 2006.

Foxborough (Liberal Democrats hold)

Duncan Buchanan served as a Councillor from Baylis & Stoke ward from 2004 to 2006.

Haymill (Liberal hold)

Councillor Stokes was the Leader of the Council (2004–2008) and of the BILLD group.

Kedermister (Labour hold)

Langley St Mary's (Conservative gain from The Slough Party)

Neil Arnold was elected in 2004 as an Independent Langley Residents candidate. He supported the coalition administration until he joined The Slough Party around the time of the 2007 council election.

Peter Dale-Gough is the husband of Diana Coad, another Councillor from this ward.

Upton (Conservative hold)

Julia Long is a former Mayor of Slough from 2004–2005

Wexham Lea (Independent hold)

Councillor Haines is a member of the BILLD group and a supporter of the former (2004–2008) coalition administration.

Members of Slough Borough Council May 2008

Notes:-
 * Member of the Britwellian, Independent, Liberal and Liberal Democrats Group (BILLD)
 (a) A.S. Dhaliwal: Formerly served 2000-2004
 (b) Parmar: Formerly served 1995-2000
 (c) Buchanan: Formerly served 2004-2006
 (d) Stokes: Formerly a Labour Councillor 1983-1986
 (e) Cryer: Formerly served 1967-1974
 (f) Long: Formerly served 1983-1990
 (g) Dhillon: Formerly Conservative 2004 and Independent Conservative 2004-2007.
 (h) Bains: Formerly served 2003-2004
 (i) Haines: Formerly a Labour Councillor 1987-1991 and 1992–1998
 (j) Khan: Formerly a Labour Councillor 1999-2002
 (k) Choudry: Defected from Labour to Conservative on 12 May 2008, after the election.
 (l) S.K. Dhaliwal, Rasib: Defected from Labour to Conservative on 13 May 2008, and re-defected back to Labour later the same day.

See also

 Slough
 Slough local elections
 Slough Borough Council
 Slough (UK Parliament constituency)

External links
 Official results 2006
 Official results 2007
 The Slough Council website coverage of the 2008 election
  The Election Commissioner's judgment in the case of Simmons v Khan
  The Boundary Committee for England page about Slough Unitary Authority, with links to pre and post 2004 ward maps
  The Victoria County History of Buckinghamshire
 Slough, UKPollingReport

References

 The History of Slough, by Miss Maxwell Fraser (Slough Corporation 1973)
 A Short History of Slough, by Kathleen M. Jones (bound typescript volume in Slough Central Library)

2008 English local elections
2008
2000s in Berkshire